Anna Constantia Thynne, Lady John Thynne (née Beresford; 1806–1866) was a British marine zoologist. In 1846, she built the first stable and sustained marine aquarium and maintained corals and sponges in it for over three years.

Lady John Thynne’s first love was geology, but in 1846 she encountered her first Madrepore and became enraptured with something that appeared to be a rock, but was a living being. Wanting to take specimens back to London from Torquay, she fixed the Madrepores to a sponge with a needle and thread, within a stone jar. She then transferred them to a glass bowl, changing the water every other day. Not having enough of a supply to continue to replace the seawater, she then switched to aerating it by transferring the water between vessels in front of an open window, a task usually undertaken by her servant.

In 1847 she added marine plants to the bowls, and in two years had created the first balanced marine aquarium.

In 1859, she published her first piece "Increase of the Madrepores" in the book "The Annals and Magazine of Natural History" regarding the Madrepores. In this she details her work with the Madrepores and how the first marine aquarium came to be.

Thynne’s work inspired Philip Henry Gosse, who developed the Fish House at London Zoo in 1853.

She was married to Lord John Thynne (1798–1881), a Canon and Sub-Dean of Westminster Abbey, and the third son of Thomas Thynne, 2nd Marquess of Bath. Her correct style was thus "Lady John Thynne".

Publication

See also
Timeline of women in science

References 

British marine biologists
Cnidariologists
Marine zoologists
1806 births
1866 deaths
Women marine biologists
Women zoologists
English zoologists
People from County Waterford
19th-century biologists
19th-century British zoologists
19th-century British women scientists
Anna
Wives of younger sons of peers